This is the list of Vice governors of Mato Grosso do Sul, the first to hold the position was Ramez Tebet and the most recent José Carlos Barbosa. To be vice-governor it is necessary to be Brazilian born and to be at least 30 years old. 

The 1989 state constitution defines that the lieutenant governor's main function is to replace the governor in the event of occasional absences and impediments, in addition to assisting him whenever he is summoned for special missions.

Upon taking office, he takes an oath to uphold and defend the federal and state constitutions, national and state laws, the integrity of the Union and the independence of the country. The Lieutenant Governor is automatically elected along with the Governor every four years, with no votes being cast directly for him, being elected on a slate basis. This system was implemented to prevent the lieutenant governor from being from the governor's opposition party.

Despite the state being installed in 1979 with the inauguration of Harry Amorim Costa, the position of lieutenant governor was only made official with the first state elections in Brazil after more than two decades, in 1982. With his absence, the president of the Legislative Assembly was next in line of succession.

List

References 

Mato Grosso do Sul